John Nugent Valentine (born 20 September 1954) is a Canadian former cricketer, a left-arm medium-pace bowler who was the first player to take a wicket for Canada in a One Day International. His batting was extremely poor, and in nine matches at ODI and ICC Trophy level his highest score was 3 not out. He played domestic cricket in Canada for Ottawa, Ontario.

Valentine appeared in Canada's runner-up 1979 ICC Trophy team with some success; he took nine wickets at 15.88, though never more than two in a single innings. He also played in his country's 1979 World Cup side, opening the bowling and removing Pakistan's opening batsman Majid Khan for 1. Valentine played two other matches for the outclassed Canadian team in that tournament, against England (taking the wicket of captain Mike Brearley) and Australia (claiming the scalp of Rick Darling). He now works as a technology teacher in Ashbury College.

Valentine's father, Barry Valentine, played cricket for Cambridge University and later became the Bishop of Rupert's Land in Canada.

References

External links

Sources
 Adams, P. (2010) A history of Canadian cricket, lulu.com. .

Canadian cricketers
Canada One Day International cricketers
1954 births
Living people
Sportspeople from Montreal
Cricketers from Quebec
Canadian people of English descent
Anglophone Quebec people